William Luff (25 December 1909 – 9 October 1981) was an Australian rules footballer who played for Essendon in the Victorian Football League (VFL).

Football
The son of Richmond's Bill Luff Sr., Luff was a good forward at Camberwell before he came to Essendon and topped the VFA's goal-kicking in 1933 with 106 goals. He continued this form when he arrived at Essendon the following season and kicked four goals on debut and five goals in just his third match.

He then returned to Camberwell in 1935 and again was the league's top goal-kicker, bagging 75 goals. The next five seasons were spent back with Essendon, who were suffering from a rare finals drought.

Camberwell "Team of the Century"
In 2003, Luff was announced as a forward pocket in the official Camberwell "Team of the Century".

Footnotes

References
Holmesby, Russell and Main, Jim (2007). The Encyclopedia of AFL Footballers. 7th ed. Melbourne: Bas Publishing.

External links
 
 William Luff, born 1909, at The VFA Project.

1909 births
Australian rules footballers from Melbourne
Essendon Football Club players
Camberwell Football Club players
1981 deaths
People from Richmond, Victoria